Muntjacs, also known as the barking deer or rib-faced deer, are small deer of the genus Muntiacus native to South Asia and Southeast Asia. Muntjacs are thought to have begun appearing 15–35 million years ago, with remains found in Miocene deposits in France, Germany and Poland. Most species are listed as Least Concern or Data Deficient by the IUCN, although others such as the black muntjac, Bornean yellow muntjac, and giant muntjac are Vulnerable, Near Threatened, and Critically Endangered, respectively.

Name
The present name is a borrowing of the Latinized form of the Dutch , which was borrowed from the Sundanese mēncēk. An erroneous alternative name of Mastreani deer has its origins in a mischievous Wikipedia entry from 2011 and is incorrect.

Description

The present-day species are native to Asia and can be found in India, Sri Lanka, Myanmar, Vietnam, the Indonesian islands, Taiwan and Southern China. Their habitat includes areas of dense vegetation, rainforests, monsoon forests and they like to be close to a water source. They are also found in the lower Himalayas (Terai regions of Nepal and Bhutan).

An invasive population of Reeves's muntjac exists in the United Kingdom and in some areas of Japan. In the United Kingdom, wild deer descended from escapees from the Woburn Abbey estate around 1925. Muntjac have expanded rapidly, and are present in most English counties and also in Wales, although they are less common in the north-west. The British Deer Society in 2007 found that muntjac deer had noticeably expanded their range in the UK since 2000. Specimens appeared in Northern Ireland in 2009, and in the Republic of Ireland in 2010. 

Inhabiting tropical regions, the deer have no seasonal rut, and mating can take place at any time of year; this behaviour is retained by populations introduced to temperate countries.

Tusks
Males have short antlers, which can regrow, but they tend to fight for territory with their "tusks" (downward-pointing canine teeth). The presence of these "tusks" is otherwise unknown in native British wild deer and can be an identifying feature to differentiate a muntjac from an immature native deer. Water deer also have visible tusks but they are much less widespread.
Although these tusks resemble those of both water deer and the musk deer, the muntjac is not related to either of these (and they are not related to each other).  The tusks are a quite different shape in each.

Glands 
Muntjacs possess various scent glands that have crucial functions in communication and territorial marking. They use their facial glands primarily to mark the ground and occasionally other individuals, and the glands are opened during defecation and urination, as well as sometimes during social displays. While the frontal glands are typically opened involuntarily as a result of facial muscle contractions, the preorbital glands can be voluntarily opened much wider and even everted to push out the underlying glandular tissue. Even young fawns are capable of fully everting their preorbital glands.

Genetics

Muntjac are of great interest in evolutionary studies because of their dramatic chromosome variations and the recent discovery of several new species. The Indian muntjac (M. muntjak) is the mammal with the lowest recorded chromosome number: The male has a diploid number of 7, the female only 6 chromosomes. Reeves's muntjac (M. reevesi), in comparison, has a diploid number of 46 chromosomes.

Species
The genus Muntiacus has 12 recognized species:

 Bornean yellow muntjac, M.atherodes
 Hairy-fronted muntjac or black muntjac, M. crinifrons
 Fea's muntjac, M.  feae
 Gongshan muntjac, M. gongshanensis
 Malabar red muntjak, M. malabaricus
 Sumatran muntjac M. montanus
 Southern red muntjac, Muntiacus muntjak
 Leaf muntjac M. putaoensis
 Pu Hoat muntjac M. puhoatensis
 Reeves's muntjac or Chinese muntjac, M. reevesi
 Roosevelt's muntjac, M. rooseveltorum
 Truong Son muntjac M. truongsonensis
 Giant muntjac, M. vuquangensis
 Northern red muntjac, M. vaginalis

See also
Deer of Great Britain

References

External links

BBC Wales Nature: Muntjac deer article

 
Muntiacini
Mammals of Asia
Mammals of Southeast Asia
Mammals of Bangladesh
Mammals of Bhutan
Mammals of Myanmar
Mammals of China
Mammals of India
Mammals of Indonesia
Mammals of Japan
Mammals of Malaysia
Mammals of Sri Lanka
Taxa named by Constantine Samuel Rafinesque